California's 26th State Assembly district is one of 80 California State Assembly districts. It is currently represented by Democrat Evan Low of Sunnyvale.

District profile 
The district encompasses part of Santa Clara County.

Part of Santa Clara County
 Alviso
 Burbank
 Cupertino
 Fruitdale
 San Jose
 Santa Clara
 Sunnyvale

Election results from statewide races

List of Assembly Members 
Due to redistricting, the 26th district has been moved around different parts of the state. The current iteration resulted from the 2011 redistricting by the California Citizens Redistricting Commission.

Election results 1992 - present

2020

2018

2016

2014

2012

2010

2008

2006

2004

2002

2000

1998

1996

1994

1992

See also 
 California State Assembly
 California State Assembly districts
 Districts in California

References

External links 
 District map from the California Citizens Redistricting Commission

26
Government of Inyo County, California
Government of Kern County, California
Government of Tulare County, California
Bishop, California
Owens Valley
Porterville, California
Sierra Nevada (United States)
Visalia, California